Pleasure To Meet You is the second album by American rock band Dead Sara. It was released on March 31, 2015 under INgrooves Music Group and Pocket Kid Records. The band financed the album with a PledgeMusic campaign, with pledgers receiving a free download of the single "Suicidal".

Music videos were released for the songs "Mona Lisa" and "Something Good," both of which were performed live on Late Night with Seth Meyers on April 1, 2015.

Track listing

Personnel

 Dead Sara

 Emily Armstrong – vocals, guitar
 Siouxsie Medley – guitar
 Chris Null – bass guitar
 Sean Friday – drums, percussion

 Additional Musicians
 Maxim Ludwig – harmonica
 Eugene Toale – saxophone

 Technical

 Noah Shain – production, engineering, mixing
 Dave Collins – mastering
 Dalton Hibbard – assistant engineering
 Mike McCmullen – artwork
 Brian Bowen-Smith  –  photography

Charts

References

2015 albums
Dead Sara albums